Haig Avenue is a football stadium in Blowick, Southport, Merseyside, England, that holds 6,008 people (1,660 seated, 4,164 standing) Since its opening in 1905 it has been the home ground of Southport F.C. Everton Reserves also use the stadium for home games.

Location
The ground is situated in Blowick, which is just inside the east boundary of Southport near the A570, the main road from Southport to Ormskirk and the M58 motorway. It is sited at the edge of a residential area, adjoining school playing fields.

Stadium
Haig Avenue now has a capacity of 6,008 but its record attendance is 20,010 for two matches played by Southport against Newcastle United in the fourth round of the FA Cup in 1932 and against Everton in a 1968 FA Cup tie. Since Southport lost Football League status in 1978, the ground has seldom operated at more than a quarter full, although nearly full houses were registered for key matches such as the 1998 F.A. Trophy semi-final against Slough Town, which Southport won to reach their first ever Wembley final, and their 2010 FA Cup third round home tie against Sheffield Wednesday.

The ground has a covered main stand on the north side of the ground (the entrance to it is from Haig Avenue, the road) called "the Grandstand". This is opposite an uncovered terrace on the south side, known as "the Popular Side". Behind the goals, the west (Scarisbrick) end is covered and this is where the majority of the home fans congregate. The west stand is called the "Jack Carr Stand", after a popular director at the club, and was named shortly after his death. The east (Blowick) end, used mainly by away team supporters, is open to the elements. The north and west sides of the ground back onto residential property and the uncovered south and east sides onto the playing fields of the nearby Meols Cop High School. The Haig Avenue road is a thoroughfare linking Scarisbrick New Road (A570) with Meols Cop Road and Norwood Road.

There are limited car parking facilities and these are reserved for home, away and match officials. There is usually ample parking in local streets.

History

Southport F.C. moved to what is now called Haig Avenue in 1905 (then called Ash Lane). The road the ground is situated on and the ground itself were officially renamed Haig Avenue after Earl Haig in 1921.

The grandstand that now stands at Haig Avenue was opened in August 1968, 2 years after the original main stand had burnt down. The wooden structure, which had been purchased from the Southport Flower Show, burnt down the day after a 1-0 victory game against Wrexham on Boxing Day in 1966, destroying the stand, dressing rooms and offices. The blaze began around 5am on 27 December and most of the clubs possessions, including kits, went up in flames with only the club safe, holding some of the previous day's takings, surviving. Following the fire, the club appealed for donations to help towards the £70,000 restoration costs. A temporary main stand was put up instead during the season Billy Bingham's side won promotion to the third division. Eric Morecambe presented the club with a trophy to commemorate their achievement.

In April 1973, following his first Grand National victory, Red Rum was presented to the crowd at half time during a match against Lincoln City.

Today there is open terracing at the 'Blowick' away end and on the 'Popular' side opposite the Main Stand. Covered terracing for about 10,000 spectators on the Popular side and Scarisbrick end was demolished following legal action against the football club by Sefton Council under the Safety of Sports Grounds legislation.

However, on 10 September 2012, it was announced that Merseyrail had agreed a sponsorship deal that would see Haig Avenue renamed the "Merseyrail Community Stadium".

After years of procrastination, the club said that in the summer of 2014, with the financial assistance of 'Trust in Yellow' (the Supporters' Trust), County Insurance and a grant from the football authorities, it would erect new corner floodlights to replace those erected along the sides of the pitch over 40 years ago. While some preparatory work on the project started in May/June 2014, just within the deadline set in the town planning conditions, the club has since revised the completion date to November 2014.

Everton Reserves currently play their home games at the stadium.

On 4 August 2019, it was announced that the stadium would now be known as The Pure Stadium after Pure Business Group offered a 3-year naming deal.

Events
The ground has played host to youth internationals in the past, and has also been home to both Liverpool F.C. and Everton F.C. reserves. It has also numerous hosted FA Women's Cup ties. Everton Ladies played the first half of the 2018-19 season at the ground.

For the coronation in 1937, an estimated attendance of 15,000 packed into the ground for the celebrations.

References

Southport F.C.
Southport
Football venues in England
Buildings and structures in the Metropolitan Borough of Sefton
Sports venues in Merseyside
Sports venues completed in 1905
English Football League venues
Women's Super League venues
Douglas Haig, 1st Earl Haig
1905 establishments in England